Training is the teaching of knowledge, vocational or practical matters.

Training may also refer to:

Eccentric training
Instructor-led training
Physical training:
Physical fitness training
Training as a part of Physical exercise
Animal training
Dog training
Sports training
Training (meteorology), a successive series of showers or thunderstorms moving repeatedly over the same area
Training (civil), refers to the use of structures built to constrain rivers 
Training (computer science), to initialize a machine learning system using prepared data (the training set)
 Training (gunnery), the pointing of turreted guns in a particular direction
Training (poem), a poem by Wilfred Owen